Living Death ( lit. "Distrust Hell", also known as Possessed) is a 2009 South Korean horror film written and directed by Lee Yong-ju. The film received 248,503 admissions in South Korea.

Plot 
A college student named Hee-jin (Nam Sang-mi) returns home when her 14-year-old sister So-jin (Shim Eun-kyung) goes missing. Her mother (Kim Bo-yeon), a fanatic churchgoer, resorts to prayer and refuses to work with the lazy police to find So-jin. Meanwhile, a neighbor commits suicide and leaves a will for So-jin, and Hee-jin hears rumors that her sister had been possessed. The whereabouts of So-jin become increasingly elusive and the dead neighbor begins appearing in Hee-jin's dreams.

Cast

Production 
The early working title for the film was Bi-myeong ("Scream"). It was shown during the 2010 Tribeca Film Festival.

Awards and nominations

References

External links 
  
 
 
 
 
 

2009 horror films
South Korean horror films
South Korean mystery films
Religious horror films
Films about suicide
Films about spirit possession
Films directed by Lee Yong-ju
2000s Korean-language films
2009 films
Showbox films
2009 directorial debut films
2000s South Korean films